Thierry Cibone (born 8 August 1973) is a Paralympian athlete from France competing mainly in category F35 throwing events.

Cibone has competed in 3 Paralympics. His first was in 2000 Summer Paralympics in Sydney where he won a clean sweep of the throwing gold medals, winning discus, javelin and shot put.  In 2004 Summer Paralympics in Athens as defending champion in all the throws he ended the games with just two bronze medals, in the discus and the javelin.  He also competed in the discus and shot in 2008 but was nable to win any medals.

References
 
 

1973 births
Living people
Paralympic athletes of France
Paralympic gold medalists for France
Paralympic bronze medalists for France
Paralympic medalists in athletics (track and field)
Athletes (track and field) at the 2000 Summer Paralympics
Athletes (track and field) at the 2004 Summer Paralympics
Athletes (track and field) at the 2008 Summer Paralympics
Athletes (track and field) at the 2012 Summer Paralympics
Medalists at the 2000 Summer Paralympics
Medalists at the 2004 Summer Paralympics
Medalists at the 2012 Summer Paralympics
French male discus throwers
French male javelin throwers
French male shot putters